Matthew, Matt, or Matty Taylor may refer to:

Arts
 Matthew Taylor (bassist), member of the band Motion City Soundtrack
 Matthew Taylor (composer) (born 1964), English composer
 Matt Taylor (musician) (born 1948), Australian blues musician
 Matthew Taylor (musician) (born 1968), American musician, member of the band Bellini
 Maddie Taylor (born 1966), American voice actress, formerly known as Matthew Taylor
 Matthew Taylor (sculptor) (1837–1889), English sculptor

Sport
 Matthew Taylor (footballer) (born 1981), English footballer
 Matt Taylor (footballer, born 1982), English footballer and manager
 Matty Taylor (footballer, born 1990), English footballer for Oxford United
 Matthew Taylor (cricketer, born 1973), English cricketer
 Matt Taylor (New Zealand cricketer) (born 1992), New Zealand cricketer
 Matthew Taylor (cricketer, born 1994), English cricketer
Matthew Taylor (cricketer, born 1999)
 Matt Taylor (soccer) (born 1981), American soccer player
 Matt Taylor (canoeist) (born 1970), American slalom canoer
 Matt Taylor (rugby union) (born 1972), Scottish rugby coach
 Mattie Taylor (born 1993), Irish Gaelic footballer

Politics
 Matthew Taylor (political strategist) (born 1960), formerly adviser to Tony Blair and director of the IPPR
 Matthew Taylor, Baron Taylor of Goss Moor (born 1963), Cornish former Liberal Democrat MP
 Matt Taylor (politician) (born 1973), Australian politician

Other
 James Madison Taylor (fl. 1868–1886), aka Matt Taylor, early Idaho settler and builder of the Taylor bridge in what is now Idaho Falls
 Matt Taylor (meteorologist) (born 1976), BBC weather presenter
 Matthew Taylor (architect) (born 1975), architect and campaigner
 Matt Taylor (scientist) (born 1973), project scientist of the Rosetta mission
 Matthew Taylor (blogger), author of Techmoan YouTube channel

See also
 Taylor (disambiguation)
 List of people with surname Taylor